Abdelouafi Laftit (born 29 September 1967) is a Moroccan politician, currently serving as Minister of the Interior since 5 April 2017.

Biography 
Laftit was born in Tafersit. He graduated from the École Polytechnique in 1989, and the École des ponts ParisTech in 1991. He is also married, with four children.

Political career 
Laftit previously worked in several positions in the regional and port sectors before he was appointed Wali (governor) of the Rabat-Salé-Zemmour-Zaer region by King Mohammed VI on 24 January 2014, as well as of the Rabat prefecture. He remained in his position as Wali when the region was reorganized as Rabat-Salé-Kénitra in 2015.

In April 2017, Laftit was appointed by Mohammed VI as Minister of the Interior in the government of Saadeddine Othmani. He retained his portfolio in the cabinet of Aziz Akhannouch.

Jerada protests 
On 2 April 2018, during a meeting at the Commission for the Interior, Local Authorities, Housing and Urban Policy in the House of Representatives, Laftit accused a number of organizations, including the Moroccan Association for Human Rights (AMDH), the Democratic Way and the Islamist association Al Adl Wa Al Ihssane, of calling for demonstrations "in a vain attempt to blackmail the state" and serving the "interests of media outlets hostile to the Kingdom"; his comments came amid the 2017–2018 Moroccan protests. In response, the Moroccan Coalition of Human Rights Bodies (CMIDH) said that Laftit intended to "reinforce censorship" and demanded an apology from him.

References 

Government ministers of Morocco
1967 births
Living people
École Polytechnique alumni

Riffian people